The Australian Automobile Association (AAA) was established in 1924. The AAA is the peak organisation for Australia's motoring clubs and their eight million members, and advances the interests of all road users across Australia to ensure land transport networks are safe and sustainable, and that the cost and access to transport is fair.

International membership 
The AAA is a member of the Alliance Internationale de Tourisme (AIT) and the Federation Internationale de l'Automobile (FIA).

Member organisations 
The following organisations are members of AAA:

 NRMA, New South Wales and ACT
 Royal Automobile Club of Victoria
 Royal Automobile Club of Queensland
 Royal Automobile Association of South Australia
 Royal Automobile Club of Western Australia
 Royal Automobile Club of Tasmania
 Automobile Association of the Northern Territory

Motor sport 
In 1926 the AAA sought authority to administer motor sport in Australia and this was subsequently obtained via the Royal Automobile Club. Following a decision to focus on its primary role, the association relinquished this authority to the Confederation of Australian Motor Sport, formed in 1953.

References

External links 
 
 The commercial interests of Australian motoring organisations are managed by Australian Motoring Services Pty.
 AAA Tourism, manages the Australian STAR rating scheme.

Automobile associations in Australia
1924 establishments in Australia
Organizations established in 1924
Automobile Association
Auto racing organizations